Alice Mary Buckton (1867-1944) was an English educator, poet, community playwright, feminist and mystic.

In 1899 Buckton established a Froebelian educational institution, Sesame House, in London. Her mystery play Eager Heart, first performed in 1903, was the first of several pageant plays written or stage-managed by Buckton. A Bahá'í convert, she recited an ode to open the 1911 First Universal Races Congress. After buying the Chalice Well in Glastonbury, she established it as a hostel in Glastonbury, helping to establish Glastonbury as a site of pilgrimage.

Early life
Alice Buckton was born in Haslemere, Surrey on 9 March 1867. She was the eldest of seven daughters of the entomologist George Bowdler Buckton, and his wife Mary Ann Odling. She came to know Alfred Tennyson, who lived nearby, and years later still wore a cloak given her by Tennyson.

Settlement and educational activity
As a young woman Alice Buckton was involved with the Women's University Settlement which grew out of the work of Octavia Hill. She then became interested in the educational ideas of Friedrich Fröbel, and traveled to Germany to visit the Pestalozzi-Fröbel House. She managed to persuade the Principal there, Annet Schepel, to come to England and help set up a similar institution in London, the Sesame Garden and House for Home Life Training in St John's Wood. In an 1898 lecture Buckton outlined a plan for this new institution. Buckton emphasised the importance of motherhood in the thought of Pestalozzi and Fröbel, and declared the kindergarten to be part of the "woman's movement". Sesame House opened in 1899, with Patrick Geddes on the committee. One woman trained at Sesame House was Lileen Hardy, who went on to open the free kindergarten St. Saviour's Child Garden in Edinburgh. By 1902 the school at Sesame House had sixty-five students. Buckton and Schepel became lifelong partners, living together until Schepel's death in Glastonbury in 1931.

Poetry and pageant plays
In 1901 Buckton published her first poetry collection, Through Human Eyes. Verse from the collection was later set to music by Gustav Holst as The heart worships.

Buckton's mystery play Eager Heart was first performed in Lincoln's Inn Hall in 1903. The play was an immediate success. Three decades later there had been hundreds of performances and over 41,000 published copies of the play sold.

Bahá'í conversion

In 1907 Buckton became drawn into the Baháʼí Faith.

Buckton attended the First Universal Races Congress in London in 1911, opening proceedings with an 'Ode of Salutation' from Europe, alongside T. Ramakrishna Pillai speaking for the East and W. E. B. DuBois speaking for Africa.

Glastonbury
In 1912 Buckton bought the Chalice Well in Glastonbury. She and Schepel opened a hostel there which drew pilgrims from around the world, and Buckton continued to live in Glastonbury for the rest of her life.

In August 1913 Buckton stage-managed Caroline Cannon's Pageant of Gwent at the National Eisteddfod of Wales. The following year she supported an Arthurian festival at Glastonbury, centered around the performance of a music drama by Reginald Buckley, 'The Birth of Arthur'. She herself wrote and produced The Coming of Bride, first performed in Glastonbury on 6 August 1914. The Coming of the Dawn was written to be produced at Christmas 1918 
by the YWCA.

In 1919 Buckton spoke at a Leisure of the People Conference in Manchester, describing the way in which everyday people in Glastonbury threw themselves into performance of pageant plays. As a result, the University Settlement organized a May festival in Ancoats, for which Buckton wrote an allegorical play around the figures of Labour, Beauty and Joy.

In 1925 she wrote a series of six radio sketches based on the Arthurian legends, performed by the Cardiff Station Radio Players with music by Warwick Braithwaite.

In 1938 she received a civil list pension "in recognition of her services to literature and of the services rendered by her father".

Works
 'Sesame Child Garden and House for Home Training', Child Life, Vol. 1, No. 1 (1899), pp. 32–36
 Through human eyes: poems. Oxford: Daniel Press, 1901. With an introductory poem by Robert Bridges.
 Eager heart: a Christmas mystery-play. London: Methuen, 1904.
 The burden of Engela: a ballad-epic. London: Methuen, 1904.
 The pastor of Wydon fell : a ballad of the North Country. London: E. Mathews, 1905.
 Kings in Babylon: a drama, London: Methuen, 1906.
 Garden of many waters, a masque. London: Mathews, 1907.
 Songs of joy. London: Methuen, 1908.
 'Order of Service for Saint Bride's Day Gathering', The Forerunner, No. 4 (July 1909)
 Ode to the First Universal Races Congress, Star of the West, Vol. 2, No. 9 (20 August 1911) 
 A catechism of life. London: Methuen, 1912.
 The coming of Bride: a pageant play. Glastonbury: Elliot Stock, 1914.
 The meeting in the gate. A Christman interlude. London: E. Stock, 1916.
 Daybreak, and other poems. London: Methuen, 1918.
 The dawn of day: a pageant. London: Blue Triangle, 1919.

References

Further reading
 Tracy Cutting, Beneath the Silent Tor: The Life and Work of Alice Buckton. Glastonbury, 2004.

External links
 Alice Buckton (1867-1944)

1867 births
1944 deaths
English Christian mystics
English Bahá'ís
People from Glastonbury
English poets
English dramatists and playwrights